Acrocercops lenticulata is a moth of the family Gracillariidae, known from Meghalaya and Assam, India. It was described by Edward Meyrick in 1922.

References

lenticulata
Moths of Asia
Moths described in 1922